Gabor Csepregi (born 17 May 1950) is a Canadian water polo player. He competed at the 1972 Summer Olympics and the 1976 Summer Olympics.

References

1950 births
Living people
Canadian male water polo players
Olympic water polo players of Canada
Water polo players at the 1972 Summer Olympics
Water polo players at the 1976 Summer Olympics
Water polo players from Budapest